Normana Wight (born 1936 in Melbourne) is an Australian artist, best known as a painter and printmaker.

Early life and education 
Wight studied painting at Royal Melbourne Institute of Technology (1954–57) and after a short time as a fabric designer and high school art teacher, later studied printmaking at Central School of Arts and Crafts, London (1962–63). Upon returning to Australia in 1964 she moved to Sydney, then Mittagong, New South Wales. She returned to Melbourne in 1967 to teach at the Preston Institute of Technology.

Career 
Wight's initial work focused on abstract forms in fields of bright colour.

In 1967, Wight's work came to the attention of Brian Finemore and John Stringer, co-curators of the seminal exhibition The Field at the National Gallery of Victoria in 1968. Wight is one of only three women artists to have work included in The Field, the others being Janet Dawson and Wendy Paramor. Wight was represented by a large painting in two parts hung vertically, 'Untitled' 1968 (cat. no. 74). She later had to destroy the work as it was too large and awkward to store. Wight's minimal abstraction was then largely forgotten for three decades until gallerist David Pestorius shone a light on it in the exhibitions Queensland Art 2009 and Normana Wight: Minimal Painting at his Brisbane gallery in 2009 and 2010 respectively. In 2017, Wight remade her work for The Field for the National Gallery of Victoria's exhibition 'The Field Revisited' 2018, and the remade work was acquired by the Gallery.

In the early 1970s, Wight shifted focus from and began using photographic sources for her works. Whilst she had produced prints in conjunction with her abstract paintings in her earlier works, printmaking soon became her primary medium, and through her production of postcards and books she sought to challenge ideas of commodification and elitism.

Between 1981 and 1986, Wight was printmaking lecturer at the University of Southern Queensland, Toowoomba.

Wight later became interested in computer-generated imagery. In 2000, she collaborated with the Victorian Tapestry Workshop on their first portrait commission, a portrait of Dame Elisabeth Murdoch, AC, DBE for the National Portrait Gallery, Canberra. The image was composed by painter Christopher Pyett, adapted on computer by Wight and woven by Merrill Dumbrell.

Wight has lived and worked in Brisbane since 2001, and is represented by Grahame Galleries + Editions, Brisbane.

In 2014 Normana Wight was interviewed in a digital story and oral history for the State Library of Queensland's James C Sourris AM Collection. In the interview Wight talks to Brisbane gallery owner, Noreen Grahame about her art, her artistic career, the influence computer technology has had on her art and her future aspirations.

Work

Solo exhibitions 

 Normana Wight: Minimal Painting, Pestorius Sweeney House, Brisbane, 2010
Posted, grahame galleries + editions, Brisbane, 2009
Pursuing the Still Life, grahame galleries + editions, Brisbane, 2003
 Small Ceremonies: Normana Wight, Lismore Regional Art Gallery, Lismore, 2000
Extracts from a Still Life, grahame galleries + editions, Brisbane, 1999
Recent Work - collage and laser prints, grahame galleries + editions, Brisbane, 1994
 Work-in-progress: the balancing act, Queensland College of Art Gallery, Griffith University, 1993.
 Normana Wight: recent work, Grahame Galleries, 1990

Group exhibitions 

New Woman, Museum of Brisbane, 2019-2020
The Field Revisited, National Gallery of Victoria, 2018
Abstraction: celebrating Australian women artists, National Gallery of Australia, touring exhibition, 2017
Queensland Art 2009, Pestorius Sweeney House, Brisbane, 2009-2010
Freemantle Print Award exhibition, Freemantle, WA, 1994
Artist books exhibition, Grahame Galleries, 1991
Shifting Parameters, Queensland Art Gallery, 1990
The Field, National Gallery of Victoria, 1968

Public collections 

 National Gallery of Australia
 Queensland Art Gallery | Gallery of Modern Art
 Art Gallery of New South Wales
National Gallery of Victoria
Art Gallery of South Australia
Monash University Museum of Art
Museum of Brisbane
State Library of Queensland
Griffith University Art Museum
University of Southern Queensland, Toowoomba
University of Queensland Art Museum

Awards and nominations 

 Acquisition - Diamond Valley Art Award, 1983
 Acquisition - Gold Coast City Art Prize, 1983
 Acquisition - Aberdare Art Prize Allied Queensland Coalfields, 1990
 Artist residency - Peacock Printmakers, Aberdeen, 1986-7
 Visiting Fellow - Queensland College of Art, Brisbane, 1993
 Artist residency - Victorian Tapestry Workshop, Melbourne, 2001

References

External links 

Grahame Galleries + editions artist page
Normana Wight digital story, educational interview and oral history. John Oxley Library, State Library of Queensland, 21 April 2014, 5min, 28min and 1:32hour version available to view online.

Australian artists
1936 births
Living people
Australian women artists